Amalie Andersen (born 6 October 1999) is a Danish ice hockey player and member of the Danish national ice hockey team, currently playing with the Maine Black Bears women's ice hockey program in the Hockey East (WHEA) conference of the NCAA Division I.

Andersen has represented Denmark at every IIHF Women's World Championship since making her senior national team debut at the 2015 IIHF World Championship Division I A. She played in the 2021 IIHF Women's World Championship, Denmark’s first Top Division tournament since 1992.

Personal life 
Andersen comes from a family full of ice hockey players, all of whom have played or currently play with the Herning Blue Fox or teams of its affiliate club, Herning IK. Her father, Ernst, played seventeen seasons as a goaltender in the Metal Ligaen and is the current goaltending coach of the Danish men's national ice hockey team and the Herning Blue Fox. Her mother, Charlotte, and uncles Kim Mohrs Andersen and Peter Nordström all played at elite levels in Denmark. Frederik, her eldest brother, was drafted 87th overall by the Anaheim Ducks in the 2012 NHL Entry Draft and, is a starting goaltender in the NHL. Her second-eldest brother, Sebastian, is also a defenceman and represented Denmark with the men's national under-18 and junior ice hockey teams in the early and mid-2010s; he has not played at an elite level since 2019. Her younger brother, Valdemar, and younger cousin, Emma-Sofie Nordström, are also goaltenders.

Career statistics

Regular season and playoffs

International

References

External links 
 

Living people
1999 births
People from Herning Municipality
Danish women's ice hockey defencemen
Maine Black Bears women's ice hockey players
Linköping HC Dam players
Danish expatriate ice hockey people
Danish expatriate sportspeople in Sweden
Expatriate ice hockey players in Sweden
Danish expatriate sportspeople in the United States
Expatriate ice hockey players in the United States
Ice hockey players at the 2022 Winter Olympics
Olympic ice hockey players of Denmark
Sportspeople from the Central Denmark Region